Charles Lalo (24 February 1877, Périgueux – 1 April 1953, Paris) was a French writer on aesthetics.

Education and career
Lalo studied philosophy at the University of Paris, gaining a doctorate in 1908. After being a schoolmaster, he succeeded Victor Basch in the chair of aesthetics at the Sorbonne, which he held from 1933 until his death.

Works
 Esquisse d'une esthétique musicale scientifique, 1908. 
 Les sentiments esthétiques, 1909. 
 Introduction à l'esthétique; les méthodes de l'esthétique, beauté naturelle et beauté artistique, l'impressionnisme et le dogmatisme, 1912. 
 L'art et la vie sociale, 1921. 
 L'art et la morale, 1922. 
 Notions d'esthétique, 1925. 
 L'expression de la vie dans l'art, 1933. 
 Éléments d'une esthétique musicale scientifique, 1939. 
 L'art loin de la vie, 1939. 
 Esthétique du rire, 1949.

References

People from Périgueux
1877 births
1953 deaths
Philosophers of art
20th-century French philosophers
French male non-fiction writers